The Vancouver Special is an architectural style of residential houses developed in Metro Vancouver, Canada.  The style was popular in the 1960s to 1980s due to ability to maximize floor space with relatively cheap construction costs.

Background
Vancouver Specials were mass-produced between 1965 and 1985. However, there are examples of homes built in the late 1940s which share the characteristics of a Vancouver Special.

The houses were first built in southeast Vancouver in the early 1960s to serve newly arrived immigrants from Europe. However, the mass production of the Vancouver Special is primarily attributed to the South Asian community after a wave of immigration in the 1960s and 1970s prompted many new immigrants to settle in the area and preside over the last large scale residential development in southeast Vancouver.

In response to public reaction to the proliferation of this design, the City of Vancouver made changes to the single-family zoning regulations in the 1980s with the intent to stop additional Vancouver Specials from being built. However, other Lower Mainland cities have not substantially changed their housing codes over the past 25 years with respect to this kind of housing design. Thus, it is still possible to build (and buy) new houses (of very similar design to the classic Vancouver Specials) in the Lower Mainland.

Characteristics

Vancouver Specials are front-gabled, 2-storey, boxy houses built on grade (i.e., without a raised foundation), with low-pitched roofs. They contain a shallow balcony on the second floor accessed by sliding glass doors. The front door is typically set to one side of the house, which allows for main living quarters on the upper floor and secondary suites on the bottom. Ground level facades are typically finished with brick or stone, with stucco at the higher levels.

Geographical distribution 
Vancouver Specials can be found all over Greater Vancouver due to their mass production. The architectural housing design can also be seen elsewhere in the outer regions of the Lower Mainland and other parts of southern British Columbia where the climate is moderate.

The housing architecture also can be found substantially in Victoria, Comox, Duncan and Nanaimo (on Vancouver Island) but is less common due to the different economic conditions and constraints there.

Design issues 
As the greater Vancouver area has not experienced a substantial earthquake (M ~6.5+) in the past 100 years, it is unclear how durable the Vancouver Special is to Seattle- or San Francisco-like earthquake land and soil movements. As there is a lot of built in modularity in this kind of housing design, it is assumed that relatively inexpensive earthquake remediation measures could be taken to increase this kind of housing architecture's ability to withstand earth movement without disintegration.

Evolution 
Vancouver Specials evolved into what were frequently derided as "monster homes" in the 1990s that many critics claimed were ruining the aesthetic character of their neighbourhoods. However, the change in house size in the Greater Vancouver area is more closely bound to the rising house prices, and property speculation. Vancouver house prices had increased year-on-year more than many other similarly sized Canadian cities (and regions) in the previous 25 years.

In contrast to the earlier Vancouver Specials, monster homes were appearing in wealthier areas of the city, and critics were sometimes charged with being concerned as much about immigrants invading their exclusive neighbourhoods as they were about the aesthetics of the neighbourhoods.

Cultural references 
The much maligned Vancouver Special, however, may yet see its bad reputation improve. Some indications include a locally produced music compilation compact disc in 2000, "Vancouver Special," which features several examples of the house design on the cover, and a renovated Vancouver Special that won the Lieutenant-Governor of British Columbia's Innovation Award for Architecture in 2005.

A home design store on Main Street bears the name "Vancouver Special" and Arsenal Pulp Press of Vancouver published Vancouver Special, a book of essays about the city by Charles Demers, in November 2009, showing that the reputation of the homes may have now gained a certain vintage glamour.

Local brewery, R&B Brewing, offers a West Coast IPA named after the Vancouver Special.

See also 
McMansion
Vancouverism
Dingbat (building)

References

External links and sources 

 Home Improvements, by David Carrigg, Vancouver Courier (5 November 2004)
 Vancouver Special Redux, by Christopher MacDonald, Canadian Architect (July 2004)
 Vancouverspecial.com, a gallery and location-map of Vancouver Special houses
 Vancouver Special by Arsenal Pulp Press (November, 2009)
 Flickr set of examples

Architectural styles
House types
House styles
Buildings and structures in Greater Vancouver
Canadian architectural styles